The red-necked wallaby or Bennett's wallaby (Notamacropus rufogriseus) is a medium-sized macropod marsupial (wallaby), common in the more temperate and fertile parts of eastern Australia, including Tasmania. Red-necked wallabies have been introduced to several other countries, including New Zealand, the United Kingdom (in England and Scotland), Ireland, the Isle of Man, France and Germany.

Description

Red-necked wallabies are distinguished by their black nose and paws, white stripe on the upper lip, and grizzled medium grey coat with a reddish wash across the shoulders. Red-necked wallabies are very similar in appearance to the black-striped wallaby (Notamacropus dorsalis), the only difference being that red-necked wallabies are larger, lack a black stripe down the back, and have softer fur. Red-necked wallabies may live up to nine years.

Distribution and habitat
Red-necked wallabies are found in coastal scrub and sclerophyll forest throughout coastal and highland eastern Australia, from Bundaberg, Queensland to the South Australian border; in Tasmania and on many of the Bass Strait islands. It is unclear which of the Tasmanian islands have native populations as opposed to introduced ones.

In Tasmania and coastal Queensland, their numbers have expanded over the past 30 years because of a reduction in hunting pressure and the partial clearing of forest to result in a mosaic of pastures where wallabies can feed at night, alongside bushland where they can shelter by day. For not altogether clear reasons, they are less common in Victoria.

Behaviour

Red-necked wallabies are mainly solitary but will gather together when there is an abundance of resources such as food, water or shelter. When they do gather in groups, they have a social hierarchy similar to other wallaby species. A recent study has demonstrated that wallabies, as other social or gregarious mammals, are able to manage conflict via reconciliation, involving the post-conflict reunion, after a fight, of former opponents, which engage in affinitive contacts. Red-necked wallabies are mainly nocturnal. They spend most of the daytime resting.

A female's estrus lasts 33 days. During courting, the female first licks the male's neck. The male will then rub his cheek against the female's.  Then the male and female will fight briefly, standing upright like two males. After that they finally mate. A couple will stay together for one day before separating. A female bears one offspring at a time; the young stay in the pouch for about 280 days, whereafter females and their offspring stay together for only a month. However, females may stay in the home range of their mothers for life, while males leave at the age of two. Also, red-necked wallabies engage in alloparental care, in which one individual may adopt the child of another. This is a common behavior seen in many other animal species like wolves, elephants, humans, and fathead minnows.

Diet
Red-necked wallabies diets consists of grasses, roots, tree leaves, and weeds.

Subspecies
There are two or three subspecies.
N. r. banksianus (Quoy & Gaimard, 1825) - red-necked wallaby [Australian mainland]
N. r. rufogriseus (Desmarest, 1817) sensu lato - Bennett's wallaby, which is sometimes replaced by:
 N. r. fruticus (Ogilby, 1838) [Tasmania] 
 N. r. rufogriseus (Desmarest, 1817) sensu stricto [Bass Strait, King Island]

The Tasmanian subspecies, Notamacropus rufogriseus rufogriseus, usually known as Bennett's wallaby, is smaller (as island subspecies or species often are), has longer, darker and shaggier fur, and breeds in the late summer, mostly between February and April. They have adapted to living in proximity to humans and can be found grazing on lawns in the fringes of Hobart and other urban areas.

The mainland Australian subspecies, Notamacropus rufogriseus banksianus, usually known as the red-necked wallaby, breeds all year round. Captive animals maintain their breeding schedules; Tasmanian females that become pregnant out of their normal season delay birth until summer, which can be anywhere up to 8 months later.

Introductions to other countries

There are significant introduced populations in the Canterbury Region of New Zealand's South Island. In 1870, several Bennett's wallabies were transported from Tasmania to Christchurch, New Zealand. Two females and one male from this stock were later released at Te Waimate, the property of Waimate's first European settler Michael Studholme.  The year 1874 saw them freed in the Hunters Hills, where over the years their population has dramatically increased. Bennett's wallabies are now resident on approximately 350,000 ha of terrain in the Hunters Hills, including the Two Thumb Range, the Kirkliston Range and the Grampians. They have been declared an animal pest in the Canterbury Region and land occupiers must contain the wallabies within specified areas. Bennett's wallaby is now widely regarded as a symbol of Waimate.

There are also small colonies in England in the Peak District (Now extinct), Derbyshire (Now extinct), and the Ashdown Forest in East Sussex (Population Unknown). These were established ca. 1900. There are also other sightings frequently spotted in West Sussex and Hampshire and recently YouTuber 'Wildlife With Cookie' found a population in an unknown part of England not associated with the previous mentioned locations. He also went on to locate Wallabies with Albinism in Kenilworth, Warwickshire

There is a small colony of red-necked wallabies on the island of Inchconnachan, Loch Lomond in Argyll and Bute, Scotland. This was founded in 1975 with two pairs taken from the Whipsnade Zoo, and had risen to 26 individuals by 1993.

There is a group of red-necked wallabies living wild on the Isle of Man, which are the descendants of numerous escapes from a wildlife park on the island in the 1960s and 1970s. A 2017 study by estimated their number in the vicinity of the wildlife park to be 83 individuals, including a very small number of Parma wallaby.

The Baring family, who owned Lambay Island, off the eastern coast of Ireland introduced red-necked wallabies to the island in the 1950s and 1960s. In the 1980s, the red-necked wallaby population at the Dublin Zoo was growing out of control. Unable to find another zoo to take them, and unwilling to euthanize them, zoo director Peter Wilson donated seven individuals to the Barings. The animals have thrived since then and the current population is estimated to be between 30 and 50.

This population has been present since the 1970s, when some individuals escaped from the zoological park of Émancé after a storm.

In Germany, around 10 wallabies live as a wild population in the federated state of Mecklenburg-Vorpommern since 2001.

In October 2014, three captive Bennett's wallabies escaped into the wild in northern Austria and one of them roamed the area for three months before being recaptured, surprisingly surviving the harsh winter there. The case attracted media attention, as it humorously defeated the popular slogan "There are no kangaroos in Austria."

Gallery

References

External links
 UK Wallaby Sightings

Further reading

 
 
 
 
 

Macropods
Mammals described in 1817
Mammals of Tasmania
Mammals of South Australia
Mammals of New South Wales
Mammals of Queensland
Mammals of Victoria (Australia)
Marsupials of Australia
Waimate District
Taxobox binomials not recognized by IUCN